Sheng Long is a character hoax related to the Street Fighter series, created by Electronic Gaming Monthly (EGM) as an April Fools' prank in 1992 (in an issue published mid-February). The joke, based upon a mistranslation that suggested the existence of a character named Sheng Long in the Capcom fighting game Street Fighter II, described a method to fight the character in the game. After other publications reprinted the details as fact without verifying its legitimacy, the Sheng Long hoax spread worldwide. As a result of discussion revolving around the possibility of the character's appearance in Street Fighter III during the game's development, EGM revisited the joke in 1997, printing an updated version of the hoax for the title while establishing a backstory and appearance for the character in the process.

As a character and a hoax, Sheng Long has been described as one of the most famous and well-known legends related to video gaming by publications such as GameDaily and GameSpot. The hoax influenced the creation of both Akuma and Gouken as characters in the Street Fighter series, with the former appearing in Super Street Fighter II Turbo as a secret boss. Fan appeal for the character affected later Capcom titles, with public requests for the inclusion of Sheng Long in an actual video game leading to the consideration of his inclusion in the Street Fighter: The Movie video game and years later resulting in the appearance of Gouken as both a secret boss and playable character in Street Fighter IV.

Origin
The name Sheng Long comes from a mistranslated portion of the name of a special move performed by the series' main character, Ryu; the characters shō ryū (昇龍, rising dragon) from Shōryūken (昇龍拳), Ryu's flying uppercut, are shēng lóng in Chinese pinyin. This was carried into one of Ryu's quotes to defeated opponents in the English localization of the 1991 arcade game Street Fighter II, changing the Japanese quote  to "You must defeat Sheng Long to stand a chance." As a result, players were given the impression that Ryu was referring to a person instead of the attack.

The Super Nintendo Entertainment System (SNES) port of Street Fighter II, released shortly after the April Fools' prank, changed the translation to "You must defeat my Dragon Punch to stand a chance." However, the English instruction manual for the SNES Street Fighter II referred to "Master Sheng Long" as Ryu and Ken's teacher. Instruction manuals for later ports to the SNES and Sega Mega Drive consoles replaced all references to Sheng Long by referring to Ryu and Ken as disciples of the "Shotokan school of karate". Sheng Long would later make an appearance in the 1993 Malibu Comics as Ryu and Ken's master, Shenlong was poisoned by Ryu's clone created by M. Bison, the fighting Nida accuses Ryu of having poisoned the master. A character named Gouken was later introduced in Masaomi Kanzaki's 1993 Street Fighter II manga as Ryu and Ken's sensei and was adapted into the series' backstory in Super Street Fighter II Turbo.

Original EGM April Fools 1992

The mistranslation spawned rumors about the existence of a Sheng Long character in the game, and players sent letters to video game publications attempting to confirm the character's existence. In the April 1992 issue of the video game magazine Electronic Gaming Monthly, a method was "revealed" to reach Sheng Long in the arcade game. The reporter gave an "Honorable Mention" to "W.A. Stokins" ("waste tokens") of "Fuldigen, HA" ("fooled again, ha") and claimed that the character could be found if a player using Ryu did not let the character suffer any damage during the entire game, and upon reaching the final match against M. Bison could neither hit Bison nor let him inflict any damage until the time limit expired, thus ending the round in a draw. After repeating this for ten consecutive rounds Sheng Long would then appear out of nowhere and throw Bison off of the edge screen and out of the way. The game's on-screen timer would then stop at 99 seconds, resulting in a "fight to the death" between Ryu and Sheng Long.

Sheng Long was stated to feature the special moves of all the fighters, such as Chun-Li's "Spinning Bird Kick" and Sagat's "Tiger Shot", but inflict more damage. In addition, the character was supposedly faster than any other fighter in the game, negating the pause between projectile attacks. Other attacks mentioned included an air-based throw attack and a "Dragon Punch" shown to consume his fist in flames to represent his greater power.

Publications from Europe, Hong Kong and other countries reprinted the trick without verifying it or asking EGMs permission. A Hong Kong comic based on Street Fighter II by Jademan Comics altered their story to include the character. Players tried unsuccessfully for weeks to unlock Sheng Long, until it was revealed in the December issue of EGM that it was a hoax, with the staff stating they were surprised at the worldwide coverage the joke had received.

EGM April Fools 1997
During the development of Street Fighter III, fans discussed the prospect of the character's inclusion in the new title. EGM perpetuated the hoax again in 1997 by claiming that Sheng Long was in the game, providing character artwork depicting his appearance and new screenshots. Unlike the first article, they did not finish their explanation of how to reach him, ending the article with "To reach him, you will need at least six perfects and..." Additionally, the words "April Fools" were spelled out in the first letter of the first ten sentences of the article.

The character's design was expanded on greatly in the article; Sheng Long was now stated to be the American name for the character Gouken, much like Akuma is the American name for Gouki (which would appear in the 2nd Impact revision of the game). His profile listed in the article paralleled Gouken's, but instead of Akuma killing him he was knocked into a raging river. The result gave him a scar over his eye, and a desire to get revenge on his brother. To this end, he revived several "killing techniques" of his fighting style, which included an air version of Akuma's red fireball that knocked his opponent down, a double ground high-low Hadouken, an unblockable Denjin-Shinryuu-Ken super attack that would shock the opponent, an air rapid Hadouken super attack akin to a move used by Ibuki, and a third super attack intended to be a stronger version of the Shun Goku Satsu.

EGM reported that despite this being the second Sheng Long joke, it was convincing enough that Capcom of America staff called Capcom of Japan asking why they had not been told that the character was in the game.

Legacy
Sheng Long is cited as an influential factor for the Street Fighter series, earning mention in articles such as GameDaily's "Top 20 Street Fighter Characters of All Time" list, in which the character placed nineteenth despite not being an actual character. IGN placed it second on their list of the "Top Ten Gaming April Fools' Pranks", noting it as having the biggest impact of all of Electronic Gaming Monthlys April Fools jokes. UGO.com named it one of video gaming's greatest urban legends, noting its impact upon the series' success. Capcom's community manager Seth Killian described the hoax as "a part of gaming history", comparing him to the Konami Code. However, GamesRadar listed it as one of the video game legends that they never want to hear again, stating that while it was a good prank at first, Sheng Long has gone from "sly wink to the fans" to "Borat t-shirt." The rumor is often credited with inspiring the creation of Akuma, a character who debuted as a hidden final boss in Super Street Fighter II Turbo, due to their similarities, although Capcom has never confirmed nor denied this. As in the hoax, the process of fighting Akuma would require certain achievements met during the game, with Akuma interrupting the final match of the game between the player and M. Bison. The similarity was nodded at in the high-definition remake of Super Street Fighter II Turbo, in which an Xbox 360 Achievement titled "Sheng Long is in Another Castle" (which is a pun of a well-known phrase in the early Super Mario Bros. games: "Thank You Mario! But our princess is in another castle!") could be earned for defeating Akuma in the game's arcade mode.

Street Fighter: The Movie
Sheng Long is mentioned four times in the 1995 arcade game Street Fighter: The Movie in the endings for Ryu, Ken, and Akuma. In each, he is stated as the master of Ryu and Ken and Akuma's brother, but never stated as dead. Despite the repeated mention, Sheng Long does not appear in the game. On January 30, 2007, the game's designer, Alan Noon, appeared on Shoryuken.com's forum and discussed aspects of the game cut during development, among them a playable Sheng Long character.

According to Noon, talk had circulated about adding extra characters that were not in the film. As the Sheng Long hoax and Akuma's debut in Super Street Fighter II Turbo were fairly recent at the time, the designers asked for Capcom's permission to add both characters into the game. Capcom approved the addition of Akuma, but denied the inclusion of Sheng Long. However, Capcom later unexpectedly approved the addition of Sheng Long. Noon designed Sheng Long's appearance for the title, giving him black gi pants and a long, green, padded/quilted, sleeveless Gi style top which was tied off with a black beltmandarin style, long white braided hair, Fu Manchu moustache, a thick black ribbon over his eyes due to being blinded by Akuma and one hand taking the form of a dragon's claw, described as a result of his power being so advanced, that he began to physically manifest dragon like attributes. Capcom approved the design and Luis Mangubat, an artist from the development team (who would later work at Midway Games), posed as Sheng Long. However, the character was left unfinished because of time constraints.

Street Fighter IV

In an interview in the January 2008 Issue of Electronic Gaming Monthly, Street Fighter IV producer Yoshinori Ono stated "Let's just say that [jokes] that your magazine have reported in the past might find their way into the game as fan service." Executive editor Shane Bettenhausen took this to mean the appearance of Sheng Long in Street Fighter IV, though added that if the character did appear in the game, it would be Gouken. When asked in a later interview by 1UP.com regarding the possibility of Sheng Long's appearance in the title, Ono replied "Are you coming to the Tokyo Game Show? How about you ask me that question again then." Capcom later revealed Gouken as a character in Street Fighter IV, with Ono stating in an interview with Play magazine that his inclusion in the title was in response to fans requesting Sheng Long's presence in the game.

On the first of April 2008, Capcom announced Sheng Long as a "secret, unlock-able character" in their Japanese development blog for Street Fighter IV and later posted in their official US blog accompanied with a silhouette of the character. The post took the tone of a Capcom PR representative trying to announce a character without giving away too many details, hinting that "Sheng Long is Ryu's..." then holding back and saying to wait for an official character announcement. Similar to the original EGM joke, the post lists the method to unlock him as requiring the player to win every round as Ryu without taking any damage whatsoever and then perform his "Shoryuken" move during the final boss fight. Reception to the joke the third time was negative and included criticism from 1UP.com. The following day, the Japanese website confirmed that it was indeed a joke and explained the origin of Sheng Long while adding "Sheng-Long is still now and always will be, truly a character of legend."

In March 2017, 25 years after the EGM article was published, Capcom gave Sheng Long a joke profile in the Shadaloo Combat Research Institute part of their Capcom Fighters Network website. Satirizing the Sheng Long rumor, it states that he became a living legend, appears after consecutive draw games, his moves are impossible to counterattack and always register as counter hits and that anyone that sees him will die after 24 hours. The artwork resembles his appearance in Electronic Gaming Monthly's Street Fighter III April fools article, except instead of long hair and a beard this version sports a long mohawk and a mustache forked upwards. Shortly after the page was removed.

See also
Ermac

References

External links
 FightingStreet.com article on Sheng Long

April Fools' Day jokes
Fictional karateka
Fictional Chinese people
Male characters in video games
Street Fighter
Video game characters introduced in 1992
Video game hoaxes
Urban legends